Mysterious Island is a 1951 American 15-chapter movie serial from Columbia Pictures, the studio's 46th, that stars Richard Crane, Marshall Reed, Karen Randle, and Ralph Hodges. It is an adaptation of Jules Verne's 1874 novel, The Mysterious Island (L'Île mystérieuse). As in the original story, which was Verne's follow-up to Twenty Thousand Leagues Under the Sea, this serial is set in 1865. However, Columbia's screenwriters added alien Mercurians as an additional set of villains. The serial has been labeled a space opera version of Verne's novel.

Plot
During the siege of Richmond, Virginia, in the American Civil War, POW Capt. Cyrus Harding escapes from his Confederate captors in a rather unusual way –  by hijacking  an observation balloon. In his escape, Harding is accompanied by sailor Pencroft, his nephew Bert, writer Gideon, loyal soldier Neb, and a dog. A hurricane blows the balloon off course, and the group eventually crash-lands on a cliff-bound, volcanic, uncharted (and fictitious) island, located in the South Pacific, with very unusual inhabitants. They name it "Lincoln Island" in honour of American President Abraham Lincoln.

The castaways soon encounter a group of people that include the local natives (who worship the island's volcano), Rulu (a woman from Mercury trying to extract an unnamed superexplosive element in order to conquer the Earth), Ayrton (a wild man exiled on the island) and Captain Shard (a ruthless pirate). A mystery man, who possesses great scientific powers, also makes his presence known to the group of people; he is Captain Nemo, who survived the whirlpool in 20,000 Leagues Under the Sea, and unlike the character in the Disney film, was not fatally wounded by military troops from warships. On the way, our quintet of heroes must battle the elements and peoples while trying to figure out a way off the island and back to civilization.

Cast
 Richard Crane as Capt. Cyrus Harding
 Marshall Reed as Jack Pencroft
 Karen Randle as Rulu of Mercury
 Ralph Hodges as Herbert 'Bert' Brown
 Gene Roth as Pirate Capt. Shard
 Hugh Prosser as Gideon Spillett
 Leonard Penn as Captain Nemo
 Terry Frost as Ayrton - The Wild Man
 Rusty Wescoatt as Moley
 Bernard Hamilton as Neb (as Bernard Hamilton)
 Stanley Blystone as Confederate Officer (uncredited)
 Tom Tyler as Union Rider (uncredited)

Chapter titles
 Lost in Space
 Sinister Savages
 Savage Justice
 Wild Man at Large
 Trail of the Mystery Man 
 The Pirates Attack
 Menace of the Mercurians
 Between Two Fires
 Shrine of the Silver Bird
 Fighting Fury
 Desperate Chances
 Mystery of the Mine
 Jungle Deadfall
 Men from Tomorrow
 The Last of the Mysterious Island
Source:

Production
Costumes belonging Western Costume Company were recycled from earlier serials for use in Mysterious Island. The Mercurian soldiers wear shirts from Universal's Flash Gordon and masks from Columbia's The Spider's Web.

Critical reception
Authors Jim Harmon and Donald F. Glut were largely positive when writing about the serial: "Although fantastic beyond credibility, Mysterious Island actually contained more elements from the original source than most such adaptations of the sound era".

References

External links
 
 
 
 Mysterious Island at Cinefania.com

1951 films
1950s English-language films
1950s science fiction films
1950s fantasy films
American fantasy adventure films
American black-and-white films
Films based on The Mysterious Island
Columbia Pictures film serials
Films directed by Spencer Gordon Bennet
Films set in 1865
Fiction set on Mercury (planet)
American fantasy
American science fiction films
Films with screenplays by George H. Plympton
American Civil War films
1950s American films